Highschool of the Dead, known in Japan as , is a Japanese manga series written by Daisuke Satō and illustrated by Shōji Satō. It was serialized in Fujimi Shobo's Monthly Dragon Age between the September 2006 and May 2013 issues, but was left unfinished following Daisuke Satō's death in March 2017. Fujimi Shobo and Kadokawa Shoten published seven tankōbon volumes from March 2007 and April 2011 in Japan. Yen Press published the series in North America. The story follows a group of high school students caught in the middle of a zombie apocalypse.

A 12-episode anime adaptation, produced by Madhouse and covering the first four volumes, aired in Japan from July 5 to September 20, 2010. Madhouse also produced an original video animation (OVA) episode in 2011. Sentai Filmworks released an English dub of the anime series and OVA on DVD and Blu-ray in North America.

Plot

The story follows a group of high school students and the school's nurse as they deal with the worldwide catastrophic event known as the "Outbreak". As the cast tries to survive the zombie apocalypse, they must also face the additional threats of societal collapse, in the form of dangerous fellow survivors, and the possible decay of their own moral codes. Starting from the high school, the students escape into town where they must deal with a corrupt teacher and his students. They check their homes for survivors, and pick up a little girl and a dog. Later, they hole up at a mall, travel through a police station, and eventually make their way to an elementary school that is supposedly a safe zone.

Media

Manga

Written by Daisuke Satō and illustrated by Shōji Satō, Highschool of the Dead began serialization in the September 2006 issue of Fujimi Shobo's manga magazine Monthly Dragon Age. The manga went on hiatus from 2008 to 2010, but after March 2011, only one more chapter was released in April 2013. The series was left unfinished following Daisuke Satō's death on March 22, 2017. Fujimi Shobo and Kadokawa Shoten published seven tankōbon volumes from March 1, 2007 and April 25, 2011 in Japan.

A full-color version of the manga, called , began serialization in the February 2011 issue of Monthly Dragon Age. Kadokawa Shoten released the manga's seven volumes from February 25, 2011 to March 9, 2013. In North America, the full-color edition began serialization in the March 2011 issue of Yen Press' Yen Plus online magazine, and ran until the July 2011 issue. The volumes were later released in two hardcover omnibus volumes on November 22, 2011 and December 17, 2013.

Shortly following the inception of the series and before it was licensed for distribution in English, the manga became popular enough in English via scanlation to draw the attention of the creators, who included a message in English within the magazine's printing of the fifth chapter that requested readers to buy the original manga when it is available. The manga was later licensed in North America by Yen Press, and the first volume was released on January 25, 2011. The series is also published in Spain by Glénat España, in Germany by Carlsen, in Italy, Brazil, Mexico and Colombia by Panini Comics, in Canada and France for French-language publication by Pika Édition, in Poland by Waneko, and in Taiwan by Kadokawa Media.

A crossover manga by Shōji Satō, called , was published on August 9, 2012, featuring characters from Triage X, Sato's other work.

The author of the series, Daisuke Satō became sick in 2008, which made the production of the manga very difficult. After the death of Daisuke Satō in 2017, Kawanakajima and Shōji Satō agreed that the series should be stopped as is and instead focus on the Triage X series.

Anime

An anime adaptation aired on the Japanese network AT-X from July 5 to September 20, 2010, with subsequent broadcasts on TV Kanagawa, Tokyo MX, Chiba TV, KBS Kyoto, TV Aichi, TV Saitama, and Sun TV. Produced by Geneon Universal Entertainment, Showgate, AT-X and Madhouse, the series is directed by Tetsurō Araki, with Yōsuke Kuroda handling series composition, Masayoshi Tanaka designing the characters and Takafumi Wada composing the music. Six DVD and Blu-ray volumes were released by Geneon Universal Entertainment between September 22, 2010 and February 23, 2011.

In North America, the anime series was licensed by Sentai Filmworks for simulcast on the Anime Network Some of the more graphic scenes were censored. In Australia and New Zealand, the series was licensed by Madman Entertainment. Sentai and Madman later gained additional rights to the series, with Section23 Films releasing the series with an English dub (produced by Seraphim Digital) on Blu-ray and DVD on June 28, 2011. Manga Entertainment also released the series in the United Kingdom. The English dub of the series aired on Anime Network's VOD service from March 10, 2011 to May 26, 2011, and was made available on Microsoft's Zune Marketplace and Apple's iTunes Store on May 27, 2011 and June 27, 2011, respectively.

An original video animation episode, titled "Drifters of the Dead", was bundled on Blu-ray with the limited edition release of the seventh volume of the manga on April 26, 2011. It was originally intended for a February release, but was pushed back. It was later licensed by Sentai Filmworks in North America for streaming, with the DVD and Blu-ray being released on November 26, 2013.

Music
The series' opening theme is "Highschool of the Dead" by Kishida Kyoudan & The Akeboshi Rockets. The series' closing theme songs differ in each episode, and each are sung by Maon Kurosaki. The CD single for the opening theme was released on August 18, 2010 by Geneon Universal Entertainment. The CD single features the TV and instrumental versions of "Highschool of the Dead" and a new song called , along with an instrumental version of the song. A CD containing all 12 ending themes sung by Kurosaki was released by Geneon on September 22, 2010, along with an original soundtrack.

Light novel
A light novel, called , was published in March 2011.

Reception
In Japan, the sixth volume of Highschool of the Dead reached #5 on the Oricon charts between July 5 and July 11, 2010, selling 92,040 copies, and #13 between July 12 and July 18, 2010, selling 43,714 copies for a total of 135,754 copies. The seventh volume of Highschool of the Dead reached #11 on the Oricon charts between May 2 and May 8, 2011, selling 57,016 copies, #2 between May 9 and May 15, 2011, selling 115,154 copies, and #19 between May 16 and May 22, 2011, selling 34,362 copies for a total of 206,532 copies. As of May 2011 the manga has 3 million copies in circulation

In North America, the second volume of the manga reached The New York Times Best-Selling Manga List, reaching #4 between April 24 and April 30, 2011, #10 between May 1 and May 7, 2011, and #8 between May 8 and May 14, 2011.

For the anime adaptation, Chris Beveridge from Mania.com comments on the first episode, "There's a lot to like here if you're looking for something beyond the usual high school dramas and comedies of the last few years." Carlo Santos of Anime News Network states that, "Other recent zombie works in Western entertainment have tried to play it ironic, or postmodernist, or just plain silly, but this one goes for straight-up horror—and pulls it off admirably." However, Zac Bertschy, also of Anime News Network, states for this episode that, "It just could've easily been written by a script generator or a horror fan with 19 minutes to kill."

Andy Hanley of the UK Anime Network summaries the first manga volume as: "Nothing ground-breaking here, but a volume of mindless fun that brings all of the gory entertainment of a zombie apocalypse to the printed page." Nate Lanxon of Wired UK praises its production quality despite having no single original element.

At San Diego Comic-Con "Best and Worst Manga of 2011" panel, it was listed among the "Worst Manga" in a series of rapid-fire questions.

In March 2015, the Chinese Ministry of Culture announced a crackdown on sites hosting overly-violent or sexual anime content, with Highschool of the Dead being singled out as an example due to its sexual content; the Ministry described it as "borderline-pornographic". On June 12, 2015, the Chinese Ministry of Culture listed Highschool of the Dead among 38 anime and manga titles banned in China.

Appearances in other titles
Illustrator Shōji Satō featured Rei and Saeko in crossover illustrations for his other manga Triage X and the video game Lollipop Chainsaw, where their high school uniforms are available as unlockable costumes for main character Juliet Starling. It was also briefly featured roughly halfway through episode 4 of Waiting in the Summer.

References

External links

 Fujimi Shobo's Highschool of the Dead website 
 Anime official website 
 High School of the Dead at the Anime Network
 
  

2006 manga
2010 anime television series debuts
2011 anime OVAs
Anime and manga controversies
Anime series based on manga
Apocalyptic anime and manga
Bioterrorism in fiction
Discrimination in fiction
Domestic violence in fiction
Fiction set in 2010
Fujimi Shobo manga
Horror anime and manga
Kadokawa Dwango franchises
Kadokawa Shoten manga
Madhouse (company)
Mass murder in fiction
NBCUniversal Entertainment Japan
Sentai Filmworks
Shōnen manga
Supernatural thriller anime and manga
Television censorship in China
Television shows written by Yōsuke Kuroda
Tokyo MX original programming
Unfinished comics
Works about murder
Works about rape
Works about sexual abuse
Works about sexual harassment
Works about torture
Works banned in China
Yen Press titles
Zombies in anime and manga
Zombies in television